Ostatnia brygada (alternative title: Prawo do szczęścia) is a 1938 Polish film directed by Michał Waszyński. The film's art direction is by Jacek Rotmil.

Cast
Zbigniew Sawan ...  Andrzej Dowmunt
Maria Gorczyńska ...  Lena 
Elżbieta Barszczewska ...  Ewa 
Lidia Wysocka ...  Marta Rzecka
Jerzy Pichelski ...  Żegota 
Kazimierz Junosza-Stępowski ...  Kulcz, Lena's husband
Stanisław Sielański ...  Feliks
Pelagia Relewicz-Ziembińska ...  Zuzanna
Aleksander Balcerzak ...  Janek 
Marcin Bay-Rydzewski ...  Valet 
Józef Maliszewski ...  Doctor 
Henryk Rydzewski ...  Officer 
Artur Socha ...  Engineer 
Zofia Wilczyńska ...  Chambermaid

External links 
 

1930s Polish-language films
Polish black-and-white films
Films directed by Michał Waszyński
Films based on Polish novels
Films based on works by Tadeusz Dołęga-Mostowicz
1938 drama films
1938 films
Polish drama films